The 1980 France rugby union tour of South Africa was a series of matches played by the France national rugby union team in South Africa in November 1980. France lost their only international match against the South Africa national rugby union team.

Results
Scores and results list France's points tally first.

References

1980 rugby union tours
1980
Rugby union and apartheid
1980 in South African rugby union
1980–81 in French rugby union